Galan (also Romanized as Galān; also known as Galūn) is a village in Pain Khiyaban-e Litkuh Rural District, in the Central District of Amol County, Mazandaran Province, Iran. At the 2006 census, its population was 332, in 81 families.

References 

Populated places in Amol County